The Meridian Speedway is a  span of railroad track between Meridian, Mississippi, and Shreveport, Louisiana. An important rail link between the Southeast and Southwest U.S., it is owned by the Meridian Speedway LLC (MSLLC), a joint venture of Kansas City Southern (KCS), the majority partner; and Alabama Great Southern Railroad, a subsidiary of Norfolk Southern Railway (NS).

History
The Speedway was originally two railroads: the Alabama and Vicksburg Railway built the section from Meridian to Vicksburg, while the Vicksburg, Shreveport and Pacific Railway built the section from Vicksburg to Shreveport. Together they were known as the "Vicksburg Route."

These railroads, as well as others forming a line from New Orleans, Louisiana, through Meridian to Cincinnati, Ohio, were joined in 1881 to form the Queen and Crescent Route, controlled by the Alabama, New Orleans, Texas and Pacific Junction Railways Company, Limited.

In 1926, the Vicksburg Route was leased by the Illinois Central Railroad, which was renamed Illinois Central Gulf in 1972. In 1986, ICG divested itself of the line when it spun off MidSouth Rail Corporation. In 1993, KCS acquired the line as part of its purchase of MidSouth.  

On December 2, 2005, KCS and NS announced their agreement to form a joint venture. KCS contributed the rail line, NS $300 million in cash, almost all of which was slated for capital improvements to increase capacity and improve transit times. The U.S. Surface Transportation Board (STB) completed its regulatory review on April 10, 2006; KCS and NS closed the deal on May 1. By September 2007, about $135 million had been spent on the improvements. Several new and longer passing sidings were installed along with a new CTC signaling system. The mainline was effectively rebuilt from the ground up with new ballast, crossties and heavier welded rail.

Soon after this first round of improvements, about 45 trains per day traversed the line.

In 2022, a proposal was made for passenger service on this line from Dallas to Meridian.

Current operations
Today, the line sees fewer than 15 trains per day, mostly run-through Kansas City Southern intermodal trains.

References

Kansas City Southern Railway
Norfolk Southern Railway
Spin-offs of the Kansas City Southern Railway
Non-operating common carrier freight railroads in the United States
Louisiana railroads
Mississippi railroads